Zen and the Brain: Toward an Understanding of Meditation and Consciousness is a 1998 book by neurologist and Zen practitioner James H. Austin, in which the author attempts to establish links between the neurological workings of the human brain and meditation. The eventual goal would be to establish mechanisms by which meditation induces changes in the activity of the brain, which in turn induces a state of mental clarity. For example, Austin presents evidence from EEG scans that deep relaxed breathing reduces brain activity.

The publishers described their book as a "Comprehensive text on the evidence from neuroscience that helps to clarify which brain mechanisms underlie the subjective states of Zen, and employs Zen to 'illuminate' how the brain works in various states of consciousness". Austin starts with a discussion of Zen Buddhism, its goals, and practices. Having laid this groundwork, he then turns to explore the neurological basis of consciousness.

Austin wrote a follow-up, Zen-Brain Reflections.

See also
 Neurotheology
 Rational mysticism

References
James H. Austin, Zen and the Brain: Toward an Understanding of Meditation and Consciousness. Reprint edition July 2, 1999. MIT Press. 
 James H. Austin, Zen-Brain Reflections. First edition February 14, 2006. MIT Press.

External links
Your Brain on Religion: Mystic visions or brain circuits at work? (Newsweek article on Austin and neurotheology, May 2001)
Interview with the author (James H. Austin, M.D. discusses Zen and the Brain)
Excerpts from the book

1998 non-fiction books
Neuroscience books
Psychology books
Books about Zen